Biltine Prefecture was one of the 14 prefectures of Chad. Located in the east of the country, Biltine covered an area of 46,850 square kilometers and had a population of 184,807 in 1993. Its capital was Biltine.  The Amdang language, spoken in parts of the prefecture, is sometimes called "Biltine".

References

Prefectures of Chad